Millcreek station is a light rail station in South Salt Lake, Utah, United States serviced by the Blue Line and the Red Line of Utah Transit Authority's TRAX light rail system. The Blue Line provides service from Downtown Salt Lake City to Draper. The Red Line provides service from the University of Utah to the Daybreak community of South Jordan.

Description 
The station is located at 210 West 3300 South (SR-171) and is easily accessed from 3300 South (and the nearby I-15/3300 South interchange) via 230 West (Washington Street). However, eastbound buses access the station by turning north on 300 West, then west on West Gregson Avenue, and then south to the station on 230 West.

The station has a free Park and Ride lot with over 100 free parking spaces available. The station opened on December 4, 1999 as part of the first operating segment of the TRAX system and is operated by the Utah Transit Authority.

Notes

References 

TRAX (light rail) stations
Railway stations in Salt Lake County, Utah
Railway stations in the United States opened in 1999
1999 establishments in Utah